The 1948–49 season was the 26th season of the Slovenian Republic League and the fourth in the SFR Yugoslavia. The league champions Železničar Ljubljana and second placed Rudar Trbovlje qualified for the Yugoslav Third League.

Final table

Qualification for the Yugoslav Second League

External links
Football Association of Slovenia 

Slovenian Republic Football League seasons
Yugo
3
Football
Football